Synanceia nana, the Red Sea stonefish or dwarf scorpionfish, is a species of venomous, marine ray-finned fish, a stonefish belonging to the subfamily Synanceiinae which is classified as being within the family Scorpaenidae, the scorpionfishes and their relatives. It is found in the northwestern Indian Ocean.

Taxonomy
Synanceia nana Was first formally described in 1973 by William N. Eschmeyer and Kaza V. Rama Rao with the type locality given as the bay at El Himeira on the Gulf of Aqaba coast of the Sinai Peninsula in Egypt. The specific name nana means “dwarf” or “pygmy” , a reference to the relatively small size of this species.

Description
Length up to 13.5 cm, described as "hazardous" due to the venom contained in its dorsal spines. Synanceia nana has 14-15 pectoral rays as well as 14 dorsal spines all possessing dark margins. The anal fin is composed of three spines and four to six soft rays. Dwarf scorpionfish, as the name would suggest, are relatively small compared to similar species in the genus, never exceeding 135mm. Species in the genus Synanceia earn the name “stonefish” due to their gray color and dotting being similar to that of the stones and reefs they are native to. Raised bumps or “warts” dot the surface. They are also commonly coated in a slime that allows algae as well as sand particles to adhere to their body as a form of camouflage.

Distribution
Western Indian Ocean: the Red Sea and the Persian Gulf at depths between 3.5-18 meters.

Habitat 
Members of the genus Synanceia are found hiding among rocks and coral in the shallow saltwater throughout temperate and tropical areas of the Indo-Pacific Region. Due to their localization within waters as far North as the Red Sea, it can be inferred that dwarf scorpionfish are most comfortable in warmer waters ranging from 26℃ to 30℃ in ambient temperature. Being a marine fish, Synanceia nana lives in waters with a salinity range of 37-40 ppt within its local region.

Predation 
Members of Synanceia are preyed on by multiple predators including sharks, rays and sea snakes. This is possibly due to the venom excreted from their spines to be less effective against these specific organisms.

Ecosystem roles 
Not much documentation of the ecosystem effects of Synanceia nana are known, however it can be assumed with relative certainty that they play a role in population control of teleosts, polychaetes, crustaceans, and macro algae which they prey on.

Behavior 
Synanceia use their camouflage to blend into their environment for potential prey and to simultaneously conceal themselves from potential predators. When confronted with a potential predator or being threatened, Synanceia erects its dorsal spines so that if vertical force is applied onto the spines, venom is excreted from its glands acting as a presynaptic neurotoxin. Stonefish also use their camouflage for ambush predation as they half-bury themselves or sit between rocks waiting for prey.

Development 
With Synanceia nana being difficult to find, documentation of its life cycle has been relatively non-existent. However, it is known that members of the family Synanceiidae have been observed in a larval stage. In other members of Scorpaeniformes, Scorpaena scrofa specifically, embryotic development was observed. The time between fertilization and hatching was measured at 30 hours and 25 minutes.

Reproduction 
While reproduction has not been well documented, reproduction is known to be carried out sexually among Scorpaeniformes due to males only possessing testes and not being sequential hermaphrodites.

Life span 
Due to poor documentation of Synanceia nana, observation of its life span is minimal. However, in a close relative, Scorpaena notata, life spans have been documented as up to 6 years for females and up to 8 years for males.

Economic importance 
Members of Synanceia are not used within the legal aquarium trade due to their highly venomous nature requiring great precautions to be taken when handling them. However, Synanceia vurrucosa, a close relative has reached new regions as a potential escapee. This could imply that members of Synanceia are sold in illegal aquarium trades.

Conservation status 
Synanceia nana is designated “Least Concern” by IUCN Red List due to their abundance as bycatch from fisheries within the Persian Gulf region. While stone fish and scorpionfish are not caught to be eaten, their venom can be denatured through cooking as it is protein based.

References

  Fishbase species 12085
Edelist, D., Spanier, E. & Golani, D. 2011, "EVIDENCE FOR THE OCCURRENCE OF THE INDO-PACIFIC STONEFISH, SYNANCEIA VERRUCOSA (ACTINOPTERYGII: SCORPAENIFORMES: SYNANCEIIDAE), IN THE MEDITERRANEAN SEA", Acta Ichthyologica et Piscatoria, vol. 41, no. 2, pp. 129-131.
Saggiomo, S.L., Firth, C., Wilson, D.T., Seymour, J., Miles, J.J. & Wong, Y. 2021, "The Geographic Distribution, Venom Components, Pathology and Treatments of Stonefish (0RW1S34RfeSDcfkexd09rT2Synanceia1RW1S34RfeSDcfkexd09rT2 spp.) Venom", Marine Drugs, vol. 19, no. 6, pp. 302
Banc-Prandi, G. & Fine, M. 2019, "Copper enrichment reduces thermal tolerance of the highly resistant Red Sea coral 0RW1S34RfeSDcfkexd09rT2Stylophora pistillata1RW1S34RfeSDcfkexd09rT2", Coral Reefs, vol. 38, no. 2, pp. 285-296.
Hereher, M.E. 2016, "Vulnerability assessment of the Saudi Arabian Red Sea coast to climate change", Environmental Earth Sciences, vol. 75, no. 1, pp. 1-13.
Terence Khai, W.T., Han, Z.C., Tunku Sara, T.A., Teh, K.K., Low, T.H. & Wahab, N.A. 2016, "Stonefish envenomation of hand with impending compartment syndrome", Journal of Occupational Medicine and Toxicology, vol. 11.
Li, K., Yin, J., Huang, L. & Lin, Z. 2014, "Seasonal variations in diversity and abundance of surface ichthyoplankton in the northern South China Sea", Acta Oceanologica Sinica, vol. 33, no. 12, pp. 145-154.
Koya, Y., Hayakawa, Y., Markevich, A. & Munehara, H. 2011, "Comparative studies of testicular structure and sperm morphology among copulatory and non-copulatory sculpins (Cottidae: Scorpaeniformes: Teleostei)", Ichthyological Research, vol. 58, no. 2, pp. 109-125.
Fairbairn, D.J. (2013). Odd couples: extraordinary differences between the sexes in the animal kingdom. [online] Open WorldCat. Available at: http://www.worldcat.org/oclc/820118780 [Accessed 28 Oct. 2021].
ŠEGvIĆ, T., GRUBIŠIĆ, L., KATAvIĆ, I., PALLAORO, A. and DULČIĆ, J., 2007. Embryonic and larval development of largescaled scorpionfish Scorpaena scrofa (Scorpaenidae). Cybium, 31(4), pp.465-470.
Ordines, F., Quetglas, A., Massutí, E. and Moranta, J., 2009. Habitat preferences and life history of the red scorpion fish, Scorpaena notata, in the Mediterranean. Estuarine, Coastal and Shelf Science, 85(4), pp.537-546.
Wu, Z., Zhang, X., Dromard, C.R., Tweedley, J.R. & Loneragan, N.R. 2019, "Partitioning of food resources among three sympatric scorpionfish (Scorpaeniformes) in coastal waters of the northern Yellow Sea", Hydrobiologia, vol. 826, no. 1, pp. 331-351.
Harris, R.J. and Jenner, R.A., 2019. Evolutionary ecology of fish venom: adaptations and consequences of evolving a venom system. Toxins, 11(2), p.60.
Khoo, H.E., 2002. Bioactive proteins from stonefish venom. Clinical and experimental pharmacology and physiology, 29(9), pp.802-806.
Chen, W., Almatar, S., Alsaffar, A. and Yousef, A.R. (2012). Retained and Discarded Bycatch from Kuwait’s Shrimp Fishery. Aquatic Science and Technology, 1(1).
Eschmeyer, W. N. and K. V. Rama-Rao 1973 (24 Oct.) Two new stonefishes (Pisces, Scorpaenidae) from the Indo-West Pacific, with a synopsis of the subfamily Synanceiinae. Proceedings of the California Academy of Sciences (Series 4) v. 39 (no. 18): 343-347.

nana
Fish of the Red Sea
Fish described in 1973
Taxa named by William N. Eschmeyer